Kyachchi (Keeççi) is a rural locality (a selo) and the administrative center of Kyachchinsky Rural Okrug of Olyokminsky District in the Sakha Republic, Russia, located  from Olyokminsk, the administrative center of the district. Its population as of the 2002 Census was 345.

References

Notes

Sources
Official website of the Sakha Republic. Registry of the Administrative-Territorial Divisions of the Sakha Republic. Olyokminsky District. 

Rural localities in Olyokminsky District